Ammonium iron(III) sulfate, NH4Fe(SO4)2·12 H2O, or NH4[Fe(H2O)6](SO4)2·6 H2O, also known as ferric ammonium sulfate (FAS) or iron alum, is a double salt in the class of alums, which consists of compounds with the general formula AB(SO4)2 · 12 H2O. It has the appearance of weakly violet, octahedrical crystals. There has been some discussion regarding the origin of the crystals' colour, with some ascribing it to impurities in the compound, and others claiming it to be a property of the crystal itself.

FAS is paramagnetic, acidic and toxic towards microorganisms. It is a weak oxidizing agent, capable of being reduced to Mohr's salt, ferrous ammonium sulfate.

Preparation
FAS can be prepared by crystallization from a solution of ferric sulfate and ammonium sulfate. Iron(II) in ferrous sulfate is oxidized to ferric sulfate by addition of sulfuric and nitric acid. Upon addition of ammonium sulfate to the solution and damping in of the solution, ferric ammonium sulfate crystals precipitate.  Equations for these conversions ignore the degree of hydration of the material.

Oxidation: 6 FeSO4 + 2 HNO3 + 3 H2SO4 = 3 Fe2(SO4)3 + 2 NO + 4 H2O

Synthesis: Fe2(SO4)3 + (NH4)2SO4 = 2 NH4Fe(SO4)2

Uses
Areas of use for FAS include waste water treatment, tanning, production of dyestuffs, and as an etching agent in the production of electronic components. It has been used in a wide area of applications, including adiabatic refrigeration equipment, biochemical analysis and organic synthesis.

Gallery

References

Ammonium compounds
Iron(III) compounds
Sulfates
Double salts